Hourigan is a surname. Notable people with the surname include:

 Christopher Hourigan, Physician-scientist
 Jack Hourigan (born 1968), Canadian actress
 Neasa Hourigan (born 1980), Irish politician
 Paige Mary Hourigan (born 1997), New Zealand tennis player
 Richard Hourigan (1939–2002), Irish politician